Merci Miles! Live at Vienne is a live album by American jazz trumpeter Miles Davis, released on Rhino and Warner Records in 2021. It was recorded in 1991 at the Jazz à Vienne festival.

The album was released as part of Rhino's celebration of Black Music Month.

Recording 
The album was recorded at the Théâtre antique de Vienne on July 1, 1991, the opening night of the Jazz à Vienne festival. The set included interpretations of songs by pop musicians Michael Jackson, Cyndi Lauper, and Prince. Davis died less than three months later, making this one of his final live performances.

Critical reception 

Reviews for the album have been largely positive. Writing for AllMusic, Thom Jurek noted "While none of this music is revelatory, it is intuitive and energetic," and described Davis's playing as "surprisingly muscular" despite the proximity to his death. Tom Moon considered it a quality late-era performance in Davis's career, writing "Where some late Davis performances tended to wander, this one is all show-biz discipline" in his JazzTimes review. In All About Jazz, Ian Patterson noted problems with the sound quality and mixing, but compared Davis's "brooding, melancholy and quite gorgeous" phrasing positively to his performance on Ascenseur pour l'échafaud.

Track listing

Personnel 
Credits taken from the album's liner notes.
 Miles Davis – trumpet
 Kenny Garrett – saxophone
 Deron Johnson – keyboard
 Foley – lead bass
 Richard Patterson – bass
 Ricky Wellman – drums

Charts

References 

2021 live albums
Miles Davis live albums
Rhino Records live albums
Warner Records live albums